Kushk-e Khalil (also Romanized as Kūshk-e Khalīl and Kūshk-i-Khalīl) is a village in Bid Zard Rural District, in the Central District of Shiraz County, Fars Province, Iran. At the 2006 census, its population was 490, in 131 families.

References 

Populated places in Shiraz County